Mindemoya may refer to:
 the community of Mindemoya in the township of Central Manitoulin, Ontario
 Lake Mindemoya, a lake near the community of Mindemoya
 Treasure Island (Ontario), an island in Lake Mindemoya
 Mindemoya River, a river flowing from Lake Mindemoya